The Indigo Line was a proposed service of the Massachusetts Bay Transportation Authority that would have incorporated parts of the former Grand Junction Railroad, the Seaport District's Track 61, a spur to the Riverside station and other MBTA Commuter Rail lines. Although it has been talked about for years, mostly in relation to the Fairmount Line, the line was formally proposed in 2014 when the MBTA released its five-year capital plan. According to the "MBTA Vision for 2024" proposal, the line would operate diesel multiple units for its rolling stock and would be fully operational in that year.

Background
The term "Indigo Line" dates back to the creation of the Fairmount Indigo Planning Initiative, which proposed transforming the Fairmount Line into a rapid transit commuter rail hybrid line. Most of the infill stations proposed by the initiative have been built, with one more planned; however, the line still uses conventional commuter rail equipment.

Indigo lines under consideration

The MBTA Vision for 2024 map shows six possible lines for Indigo DMU service:
The current Fairmount Line
South Station to Riverside via the Framingham/Worcester Line and an old right of way from that line to Riverside currently used for trolley operator training
Back Bay to the Boston Convention and Exhibition Center using Track 61
North Station to the planned West Station using the Grand Junction Railroad, with a new stop in Cambridge
North Station to Anderson RTC on the Lowell Line
North Station to Lynn on the Newburyport/Rockport Line

The Sonoma–Marin Area Rail Transit purchase of Nippon Sharyo DMU trains in 2010 included an option for 18 cars to be provided to the MBTA for the Indigo Line service.

The Indigo Line has since been indefinitely postponed.

References

External links
MBTA 5 year Capital Improvement Plan 2014-2018
Fairmount Indigo Planning Initiative

Proposed railway lines in Massachusetts
Passenger rail transportation in Massachusetts